Margot Hielscher (29 September 1919 – 20 August 2017) was a German singer and film actress. She appeared in over fifty films between and 1939 and 1994.

Hielscher was born in Berlin. In 1957, she was chosen to represent Germany at the Eurovision Song Contest 1957 with the song "Telefon, Telefon" (Telephone, Telephone). The song finished fourth out of ten, with eight points.

Hielscher was chosen again to represent Germany at the Eurovision Song Contest 1958 with the song "Für Zwei Groschen Musik" (Music For Two Pennies). The song finished seventh out of ten, with 5 points.

In 1989, she starred in the TV series Rivalen der Rennbahn. She died in Munich, aged 97.

Awards 
In 1978, Hielscher was awarded the "Bundesverdienstkreuz" and in 1985 the "Filmband in Gold" for her contributions to German cinema.

Selected filmography 
 The Heart of the Queen (1940)
 Goodbye, Franziska (1941)
 Love Premiere (1943)
 Women Are No Angels (1943)
 Ghost in the Castle (1947)
 Hallo, Fräulein! (1949)
 The Blue Straw Hat (1949)
 Love on Ice (1950)
 Nights on the Road (1952)
 The Devil Makes Three (1952)
 Homesick for You (1952)
 Hit Parade (1953)
 Jonny Saves Nebrador (1953)
 Salto Mortale (1953)
 It Was Always So Nice With You (1954)
 The Mosquito (1954)
 Murder Party (1961)
 The Blood of the Walsungs (1965)
 Salto Mortale (1969, TV series)
  (1977, TV film)
 The Magic Mountain (1982)

See also 
 Eurovision Song Contest 1957
 Eurovision Song Contest 1958
 Germany in the Eurovision Song Contest

References

External links 

Photographs and literature

1919 births
2017 deaths
Eurovision Song Contest entrants for Germany
Eurovision Song Contest entrants of 1957
Eurovision Song Contest entrants of 1958
Musicians from Berlin
Actresses from Berlin
Officers Crosses of the Order of Merit of the Federal Republic of Germany